Koygorodsky District (Kojgort rajon) is an administrative district (raion), one of the twelve in the Komi Republic, Russia. It is located in the south of the republic. Its administrative center is the rural locality (a selo) of Koygorodok. As of the 2010 Census, the total population of the district was 8,431, with the population of Koygorodok accounting for 34.9% of that number.

Administrative and municipal status
Within the framework of administrative divisions, Koygorodsky District is one of the twelve in the Komi Republic. The district is divided into three selo administrative territories and seven settlement administrative territories, which comprise twenty-one rural localities. As a municipal division, the district is incorporated as Koygorodsky Municipal District. Its ten administrative territories are incorporated as ten rural settlements within the municipal district. The selo of Koygorodok serves as the administrative center of both the administrative and municipal district.

References

Notes

Sources

Districts of the Komi Republic
